"Rose in Paradise" is a song written by Stewart Harris and Jim McBride, and recorded by American country music artist Waylon Jennings.  It was released in January 1987 as the first single from the album Hangin' Tough.  The song was Jennings' twelfth number one country single.  The single went to number one for one week and spent a total of nineteen weeks on the country chart.

Content
The song is about a beautiful young woman named Rose, who is courted by and eventually marries a rich Georgia banker. After promising her a carefree life of luxury, the banker reveals himself to be a possessive, jealous man and keeps her locked away at their home, said to be a large, lavishly-styled mansion with a large estate. The banker is a humble, soft-spoken, milquetoast individual ... except when the conversation turns to Rose: "Every time he talks about her, you can see the fire in his eyes, He says I would walk through Hell on Sunday, to keep my Rose in Paradise."

The banker hires a gardener to tend to the estate's landscaping needs ... and to keep an eye on Rose while he (the banker) makes his frequent extended business trips. Eventually, Rose disappears under mysterious circumstances ... either they ran away together or Rose had died and disappeared without a trace, never to be seen again. Late in the song, the elderly banker retires to his estate, apparently suffering from a late-life illness and rarely leaving as he simply spends his days sitting and staring at his garden and the mansion falling into disrepair around him. The last line tells how the garden has a rose that similar to the missing wife  has a beauty that cuts like a knife  and keeps growing in the wintertime and keeps blooming even in the night....

Charts

References
 

1987 singles
1987 songs
Waylon Jennings songs
Chris Young (musician) songs
Willie Nelson songs
Song recordings produced by Jimmy Bowen
MCA Records singles
Songs written by Jim McBride (songwriter)
Songs written by Stewart Harris